NFV may refer to:

 Network function virtualization
 Nicolas François Vuillaume (1802–1876), French luthier
 Northern German Football Association (Norddeutscher Fußball-Verband)
 Nelfinavir, an antiretroviral drug used in the treatment of the HIV